Iosif Rodionovich Apanasenko (April 15, 1890 – August 5, 1943) was a Soviet division commander. 

He fought in the Imperial Russian Army in World War I before going over to the Bolsheviks in the subsequent Civil War. He received the Cross of St. George three times from the Russian Empire. He was made a Komkor on November 11, 1935 and promoted to Komandarm 2nd rank in 1939. He commanded forces in both Central Asia and the Russian Far East. He was made a colonel general in 1940 before being promoted to general of the army in February 1941. He was Commander of the (quiet) Far Eastern Front until April 1943.

In June 1943, I.R. Apanasenko, after numerous requests to be sent to the front, was appointed deputy commander of the Voronezh Front. He visited units on the frontline and led them during the fighting.
He was killed by an airstrike during the Soviet counteroffensive at Kursk. He was a recipient of the Order of Lenin and the Order of the Red Banner.

References

Sources
 Социокультурный состав советской военной элиты 1931—1938 гг. и её оценки в прессе русского зарубежья
 Командный и начальствующий состав Красной Армии в 1940-1941 гг pages 112—113

1890 births
1943 deaths
People from Apanasenkovsky District
People from Stavropol Governorate
Bolsheviks
Central Committee of the Communist Party of the Soviet Union candidate members
Army generals (Soviet Union)
Russian military personnel of World War I
Soviet military personnel of the Russian Civil War
Soviet military personnel killed in World War II
Recipients of the Order of Lenin
Recipients of the Order of the Red Banner
Frunze Military Academy alumni
Deaths by airstrike during World War II